Riley Brook is a settlement in New Brunswick.

History

Said to be named for a man who drowned there. The Maliseet name was Natakayid, possibly meaning "Bald Head place".

Notable people

See also
List of communities in New Brunswick

References

Communities in Victoria County, New Brunswick
Designated places in New Brunswick
Local service districts of Victoria County, New Brunswick